Burleson Centennial High School is a high school in Burleson, Texas and a part of the Burleson Independent School District. The school is located off of E Renfro Road.  The Spartans participate in the Class 5a Division of the Texas UIL  

The mascot is a Spartan and the main colors are Royal Blue, Silver, and White.

References

External links
 Burleson Centennial High School

Burleson Independent School District high schools
Schools in Johnson County, Texas